La prova d'amore is a 1974 Italian  film. It stars actor Gabriele Ferzetti.

Cast
 Ely Galleani	as	Angela
 Gabriele Ferzetti
 Françoise Prévost
 Jenny Tamburi
 Adriana Asti

References

External links

1974 films
1970s Italian-language films
Italian coming-of-age films
1970s coming-of-age films
1970s Italian films